Emmanuelle 5: A Time to Dream is a 1994 television movie, which was the fifth episode from the erotic series Emmanuelle in Space. It was directed by David Cove, produced by Alain Siritzky, and edited by Josefine Anderson. The screenplay was written by Mark Evan Schwartz, based on character by Emmanuelle Arsan.

Cast
 Krista Allen as Emmanuelle
 Paul Michael Robinson as Captain Haffron Williams
 Debra K. Beatty as Cara
 Reginald Chevalier as Pierre
 Timothy Di Pri
 Holly Hollywood as Gee
 Claude Knowlton as Raymond
 Lori Morrissey as Jay
 Brad Nick'ell as Theo
 Kimberly Rowe as Angie

References

External links
 
 

American television films
1994 television films
1994 films
Emmanuelle in Space
1990s French films